Bibby Financial Services (BFS) is a multinational corporation that provides financial services to small and medium-sized enterprises (SMEs).

The company is a subsidiary of the Liverpool-based Bibby Line Group, which was founded in 1807 by businessman, John Bibby (1775-1840). The group diversified into financial services, haulage, retail and private-equity-style investments in businesses in the 1980s. This helped it to survive and grow whilst local rivals, such as Cunard and White Star, disappeared or were swallowed up by others. Bibby Line Group, today headed by the sixth generation of the Bibby family, is a £1.2 billion business, and operates in more than 20 countries and employing over 4,500 people in industries including retail, offshore, financial services, distribution, shipping, marine based businesses and plant hire.

History
Bibby Financial Services was founded in 1982 during Sir Derek Bibby's chairmanship of the Bibby Line Group, a post he held from 1969 until 1992.

For the first two years, BFS was operated from the Bibby Line Group accounts department, before becoming a separate business entity.

The company has a regional office network with its headquarters located in Banbury, Oxfordshire.

BFS has a network of offices across Asia and Europe, including, Singapore, the Netherlands, the Czech Republic, Slovakia, France, Germany, Poland, Ireland and the UK.

In 2020, BFS sold its North America business to ecapital.

Services 
BFS provides invoice finance, asset finance, trade finance and foreign exchange services to small and medium sized businesses across the world, helping them unlock money for a range of scenarios, including cash flow funding, new equipment purchase, growth and expansion, management buy-ins and buy-outs, and corporate restructuring.

Globally, BFS supports more than 8,800 business customers across multiple industry sectors. The business operates in Europe and Asia.

Recent Developments
In 2013, the business had a turnover of £170m. In November 2015 BFS announced that it was committing over £770m in funding to UK SMEs following a successful refinancing deal.

In September 2020, BFS appointed Jonathan Andrew as Global CEO.

In October 2022, BFS announced its plans to launch a Marine Finance business to support the financing of ships and vessels as part of its new strategy.

The Financial Times reported that BFS had secured a £1bn securitisation deal to boost SME lending in November 2022.

Covid-19 
In responding to the Covid-19 pandemic, BFS restructured its business, including the sale of its North American business which helped reduce the impact of the Covid-19 pandemic on the financial arm as one of Liverpool’s oldest firms, new documents confirmed, which was reported by Business Live.

See also

Bibby Line Group
John Bibby
Bibby baronets

References

External links

BFS blog

Companies based in Banbury
Financial services companies of England
Financial services companies of the United Kingdom
International finance
Corporate finance
British companies established in 1982
Multinational companies
1982 establishments in the United Kingdom
Financial services companies established in 1982